Orpheus was a merchant ship launched in 1818. She spent most of her career trading between London and Smyrna. A new owner circa 1827 started sailing towards Valparaiso and Lima. Orpheus wrecked in October 1827.

Career
Orpheus enters Lloyd's Register in 1819.

On 11 and 12 November 1823 Constantinople suffered a severe gale that did material damage to the shipping in the port. Orpheus, Ford, master, suffered so much damage that she required important repairs.

The Register of Shipping for 1828 gave Orpheuss master and owner as Carter, and her trade as London—Lima.

Fate
On 1 February 1828 Lloyd's List reported that Orpheus, Carter, master, had gone to pieces off the coast of South America. The mate and two crew drowned, but the master, his wife and child, and two passengers arrived at Monte Video. The wreck occurred on 28 October 1827 off the coast of South America.  rescued the survivors.

Citations

1818 ships
Age of Sail merchant ships
Merchant ships of the United Kingdom
Maritime incidents in November 1823
Maritime incidents in October 1827